Malise V, Earl of Strathearn and Caithness, Jarl of Orkney  (died ) was the last of the native Gaelic earls of Strathearn.

Biography
He succeeded to the Earldom of Strathearn in 1329, on the death of his father Malise IV, Earl of Strathearn.

After the death of Magnus, Earl of Orkney, he inherited the Norwegian Jarldom of Orkney (including Caithness) in right of his great-great-grandfather Earl Gilbert. Despite the similarity of title, and related etymology, a Norwegian jarl is not the same as a Scottish earl; the position of jarl of Orkney was the most senior rank in mediaeval Norway except for the king himself.

In 1330, King Edward III of England wrote to King David II of Scotland and his councillors, including Malise, requesting that certain forfeited noblemen have their lands restored. This request was evaded, if not outright refused, and consequently Edward allowed Edward Balliol to march into Scotland with the dispossessed knights. Malise took an active part in opposing the invaders, commanding the third division of the Scots army at the Battle of Halidon Hill, and was referred to as a "notorious rebel" by Edward III. He had his earldom forfeited by Balliol, who bestowed it on John de Warenne, Earl of Surrey. Malise made strenuous efforts to recover Strathearn, but without success, and he went to dwell on his estates in Caithness.

By 1340 the influence of Balliol and Edward III had waned, but Malise still did not get back his earldom. During King David's absence in France, he was arraigned before the High Steward and accused of felony and treason, in that he had supposedly resigned the earldom of his own free will by reason of a contract between him and the Earl of Surrey. The jury acquitted him, but the earldom remained in David's hands, who in 1344 bestowed it on Malise's nephew Maurice de Moravia.

In 1344 he was summoned before King and Parliament on the same charge. He did not attend in person, but was represented by his brother-in-law William III, Earl of Ross, along with the Bishop of Ross and a lawyer named William Meldrum. He pleaded that he had already been found innocent; this was partly acknowledged by Parliament, though they judged that the earldom should continue to be held by the King.

After this, Earl Malise passes from history; his date of death is not known.

Marriage and children
He is said to have been married twice, his first wife being a daughter of the Earl of Menteith, though no evidence has been found of her existence. His second wife was Marjory, daughter of Hugh, Earl of Ross, whom he probably married between 1325 and 1328. By her he had four daughters:

Matilda, married Wayland de l'Ard. Her son Alexander de l'Ard, was made Captain of Orkney in 1375, by the Norwegian king. This was a probationary position, and if passed, Alexander would have been made Jarl the following year; however, he was uninterested in the role, and was soon sacked. Alexander sold his lands in Caithness to Robert II of Scotland; he is sometimes referred to as Earl of Caithness as a result.
Isabella/Isabel, married Sir William Sinclair, 8th of Roslin. Their only son Henry was made Jarl of Orkney in 1379
Agneta, married Erengisle Suneson, who was briefly Jarl of Orkney
An unknown daughter, who married Guttorm Sperra

Ancestry

References

The Scots Peerage, ed. James Balfour Paul, Vol VIII (Edinburgh: David Douglas, 1911), pp. 252–4
 Neville, Cynthia J., Native Lordship in Medieval Scotland: The Earldoms of Strathearn and Lennox, c. 1140-1365, (Portland & Dublin, 2005)

1350 deaths
People from Perth and Kinross
Norwegian earls
People associated with Orkney
Year of birth unknown
Place of birth unknown
Date of death unknown
Place of death unknown
Scottish people of the Wars of Scottish Independence
Mormaers of Caithness
Mormaers of Strathearn
14th-century Scottish earls